Aboubakar Soumahoro (born 6 June 1980) is an Italian-Ivorian trade unionist, labor activist and politician, elected to the Chamber of Deputies at the 2022 Italian election. He has advocated for labor rights of migrant farmers in Italy.

Biography 
Aboubakar Soumahoro was born in 1980 in Bétroulilié in the Ivory Coast. The arrival in Italy takes place in 1999, at the age of 19. He graduated in 2010 in sociology at the University of Naples Federico II with a score of 110/110 with a thesis on "Social analysis of the labor market. The condition of migrant workers in the Italian labor market: persistence and changes".

Political career 
In the general elections of 2022, Green Europe offers Soumahoro the candidacy as an independent in the Chamber of Deputies in the context of the Greens and Left Alliance list. Soumahoro is a candidate in the single-member constituency of Modena for the centre-left, obtaining 36.01% and being unexpectedly defeated by the centre-right candidate Daniela Dondi (37.44%). Thanks to further candidacies as leaders of Greens and Lef Alliance in the multi-nominal constituencies Veneto 1 - 01, Apulia 02, Lombardy 1 - 01, Emilia Romagna 02, he was elected in the last three and was assigned, according to the electoral law, to the latter.

Following administrative irregularities that have occurred in the cooperatives managed by his mother-in-law and his partner and the launch of judicial investigations by the Latina Public Prosecutor's Office, on 24 November 2022 Soumahoro decided to suspend himself from the parliamentary group of the Greens and Left Alliance, in order to clarify his position, reaffirming his extraneousness to the whole affair.

On January 9, 2023, Soumahoro left the Green-Left Alliance, citing lack of solidarity and unwillingness to politically help him during the investigation.

References

1980 births
Living people
21st-century Ivorian people
University of Naples Federico II alumni